Frank Chodorov (February 15, 1887 – December 28, 1966) was an American member of the Old Right, a group of conservative and libertarian thinkers who were non-interventionist in foreign policy and opposed to both the American entry into World War II and the New Deal. He was called by Ralph Raico "the last of the Old Right greats."

Early life
Born Fishel Chodorowsky on the Lower West Side of New York City on February 15, 1887, he was the eleventh child of Russian Jewish immigrants. He graduated from Columbia University in 1907, then worked at a number of jobs around the country. Working in Chicago (1912–17), he read Henry George's Progress and Poverty. Chodorov wrote that he "read the book several times, and each time I felt myself slipping into a cause." According to Chodorov:

Henry George School
In 1937, Chodorov became director of the Henry George School of Social Science in New York. There, he established (with Will Lissner) and edited a school paper, The Freeman. It published articles by Albert Jay Nock (founder of an earlier journal also called The Freeman), as well as such leading figures of the day as John Dewey, George Bernard Shaw, Bertrand Russell, Lincoln Steffens and Thorsten Veblen. Chodorov used the magazine to express his antiwar views:

With the coming of World War II, such views were no longer tolerated: Chodorov was ousted from the school in 1942. He wrote that "it seemed to me then that the only thing for me to do was to blow my brains out, which I might have done if I had not had Albert Jay Nock by my side." Nock had weathered similar "war fever" during World War I when as editor of the antiwar journal The Nation, he had seen that magazine banned from the US mails by the Woodrow Wilson administration.

Analysis
Chodorov published articles in a variety of magazines, including H.L. Mencken's American Mercury, the Saturday Evening Post and Scribner's. In 1944, he launched a four-page monthly broadsheet called analysis, described as "an individualistic publication—the only one of its kind in America." Murray Rothbard called it "one of the best, though undoubtedly the most neglected, of the 'little magazines' that has ever been published in the United States."

Along with Nock's works, Chodorov was influenced by Franz Oppenheimer's The State: "between the state and the individual there is always a tug-of-war," wrote Chodorov, "whatever power one acquires must be to the detriment of the other."

The Freeman
In 1954, Chodorov again became editor of The Freeman, in its new incarnation, revived under the auspices of Foundation for Economic Education (FEE). He contributed several articles over the years to its Essays in Liberty series, beginning with Volume 1 in 1952. He engaged with William F. Buckley and Willi Schlamm on the question of whether individualists should support interventionism to aid people resisting communist aggression. Chodorov continued to advocate nonintervention, but as the Cold War continued, he lost influence: the American conservative movement came to be a bastion of interventionist foreign policy in combating Soviet expansionism.

Intercollegiate Society of Individualists
In 1953, Chodorov founded the Intercollegiate Society of Individualists (ISI), with Buckley as president, becoming the first national conservative student organization, reaching 50,000 members by the end of the century. In later years, ISI became extremely influential as a clearinghouse of conservative publications and as a locus of the conservative intellectual movement in America. It later evolved into the Intercollegiate Studies Institute.

Chodorov was a major influence on many of those who would go on to lead the libertarian and conservative movements, including Buckley, M. Stanton Evans, Murray Rothbard, Edmund A. Opitz, and James J. Martin. Rothbard, an economist, wrote:

Later years
A secular Jew, Chodorov gained a greater appreciation for religious thought in later years. He was an avid fan of westerns.

In popular culture
In the North American Confederacy alternate history series by L. Neil Smith, in which the United States becomes a libertarian state after a successful Whiskey Rebellion and the overthrowing and execution of George Washington by firing squad for treason in 1794, Frank Chodorov was chosen by the Continental Congress to be H. L. Mencken's successor after his assassination in a duel in 1933. He served as the 20th President of the North American Confederacy from 1933 to 1940. He was succeeded by Rose Wilder Lane, who served as the 21st president from 1940 to 1952.

Works
 The Economics of Society, Government and State (1946)
 One is a Crowd: Reflections of an Individualist (1952)
 The Income Tax: Root of All Evil (1952)
 The Rise & Fall of Society: An Essay on the Economic Forces That Underline Social Institutions (1959)
 Flight to Russia (1959)
 Out of Step: The Autobiography of an Individualist (1962)
 Fugitive Essays (1980)

References

External links

1887 births
1966 deaths
20th-century American male writers
20th-century American non-fiction writers
American foreign policy writers
American libertarians
American male non-fiction writers
American people of Russian-Jewish descent
American political writers
American tax resisters
Former atheists and agnostics
Georgists
Jewish American writers
Libertarian theorists
Non-interventionism
Old Right (United States)
People from Tribeca
Secular Jews
Tax resistance
Writers from Manhattan
Columbia College (New York) alumni